St. Peters Bay is a municipality that holds community status in Prince Edward Island, Canada. It was incorporated in 1953. St. Peters Bay is well known for its annual Blueberry Festival and Parade, which draws in tourists and locals alike.

Demographics 

Attractions 
Confederation Trail
St. Peter's Courthouse Theatre
St. Peters Landing, shops that opened in 2005 after a major dredging and restructuring project surrounding the bay and the bridge

Infrastructure 
The community is served mainly by Prince Edward Island Route 2 and Prince Edward Island Route 16 with other areas of the province.

See also 
List of communities in Prince Edward Island

References 

Communities in Kings County, Prince Edward Island
Rural municipalities in Prince Edward Island